Salhaviyeh (also Romanized as Şalḩāveyeh and Salhavīyeh; also known as Şalāḩāveyeh-ye Yek, Şalāḩāvīyeh, Şalāḩāvīyeh-ye Yek, Salaihāwīyeh, Şaleh Ḩāvīyeh, and Şalīḩāvīyeh) is a village in Darkhoveyn Rural District, in the Central District of Shadegan County, Khuzestan Province, Iran. At the 2006 census, its population was 350, in 42 families.

References 

Populated places in Shadegan County